William Clifton Tabor (13 December 1842 – 24 May 1867) was an English first-class cricketer.

The son of Charles Tabor, he was born at Bloomsbury in December 1842. He later studied at  Brasenose College, Oxford. Tabor made two appearances in first-class cricket, the first coming for Middlesex against the Surrey Club at The Oval in 1862, with his second match coming for Southgate against Oxford University in 1863 at Oxford. Tabor died at Brighton in May 1867.

References

External links

1842 births
1867 deaths
People from Bloomsbury
Alumni of Brasenose College, Oxford
English cricketers
Middlesex cricketers
Southgate cricketers
English cricketers of 1826 to 1863